Da, DA, dA, DÄ and other variants may refer to:

Arts, entertainment, and media
DA! (band), a Chicago post-punk band of the 1980s
Da (play), a 1978 play by Hugh Leonard
Da (film), a 1988 film based on the play
Damon Amendolara, American sports talk radio host
Daniel Amos, also known as D.A. and Dä, an American Christian rock band
Destination America, television channel
DeviantArt or dA, a website that focuses on art
Dumbledore's Army, a group formed by Harry Potter in his 5th year to teach students defensive spells

Degrees and licenses
Dental assistant
Diploma of Anesthesiology, a degree conferred by some medical institutions such as the Royal College of Anaesthetists
Doctor of Arts, an academic degree

Organizations
Da!, a Russian youth movement
DA-Group, a Finnish technology company
Debtors Anonymous
Air Georgia, a Georgian airline (IATA code DA)

Politics and judiciary
Da (political party), a defunct Israeli political party
Defence Advisory Notice, a government demand in Australia and the UK not to publish or broadcast a specified news item
Democratic Alliance (South Africa), a South African political party
Democratic Awakening, East German political party
Department of Agriculture (Philippines), an executive department
Deutsche Alternative ("German Alternative"), a rightist group
District attorney, (United States) chief prosecutor for a local government area, particularly a county
Dreptate şi Adevăr a defunct alliance of parties in Romania

Places
Da County, a division in Sichuan, China
DA postcode area, a postcode area in England
Da River or Black River, a river in China and northwestern Vietnam
Dah, Ivory Coast, a village in Montagnes District, Ivory Coast, also spelt "Da"
Danbury, a city in Fairfield County, Connecticut, US

Science and technology

Biology and medicine
DA (chemotherapy), standard-dose cytarabine plus daunorubicin
Deoxyanthocyanidin
Domoic acid, a neurotoxin produced by phytoplankton
Donor-Acceptor
Dopamine, a monoamine neurotransmitter

Other uses in science and technology
Dalton (unit) (symbol Da), also called the unified atomic mass unit
Deca- or da-, an SI prefix for a factor of 10
Distribution amplifier, a device that accepts a single input signal and provides this same signal to multiple isolated outputs
Double-action, a firearm operation mechanism in which the trigger both cocks and releases the hammer
NZR DA class, a New Zealand diesel locomotive
SJ Da, a Swedish electric locomotive
Domain authority Domain Authority

Sports
U.S. Soccer Development Academy, former United States soccer league

Other uses
D.A. Wallach (born 1985), American musician and business executive
Da (Javanese), a syllable in Javanese script
Da. or Dòna, the honorific Mrs. in Occitan language
Da Hoss, an American racehorse
Dame of St Andrew, a discontinued award within the Order of Barbados
Danish language (ISO 639-1 alpha-2 code DA)
Dearness allowance, cost of living allowance to government employees in Bangladesh, India, and Pakistan
Desk accessory, graphical programs
Direct action (military), in special operations
Disadvantage, an off-case argument used by the Negative team in a policy debate
Doomsday argument, a probabilistic argument based on demographics predicting how many people will be born
Duck's ass or duck's arse, a haircut; particularly popular during the 1950s
Dynamic game difficulty balancing, also known as difficulty adjustment or DA, an algorithm in video games.

See also
Da Da Da (disambiguation)
Dah (disambiguation)
The D.A. (disambiguation)
Boti, a cutting utensil also known as daa